Günther Platter is an Austrian politician for the Austrian People's Party (ÖVP) and was the governor of Tyrol between 2008 and 2022, succeeding Herwig van Staa. Before becoming governor, Platter served as interior minister and as Minister of Defence in the cabinets of Gusenbauer and Schüssel.

References

Austrian Ministers of Defence
1954 births
Living people
People from Zams
Interior ministers of Austria
Governors of Tyrol
Austrian People's Party politicians
21st-century Austrian politicians